Blue diamond is a type of diamond which exhibits all of the same inherent properties of the mineral except with the additional element of blue color in the stone. They are colored blue by trace amounts of boron that contaminate the crystalline lattice structure. Blue diamonds belong to a subcategory of diamonds called fancy color diamonds, the generic name for diamonds that exhibit intense color.

Properties determining value
The same four basic parameters that govern the grading of all gemstones are used to grade blue diamonds–the four Cs of Connoisseurship: color, clarity, cut and carat weight. Color is considered the absolute most important criterion in grading a blue diamond and determining its value. However, the most valuable of blue diamonds also exhibit the highest clarity grades. There is no known blue diamond with a completely flawless (F) clarity grading, although several are known which are graded Internally Flawless (IF).

One of the earliest mentioned blue diamonds is the Hope Diamond, a 45.52 carat fancy dark grayish-blue which is believed to have been discovered in India but whose first recorded presence was in 1666 by French gem merchant Jean-Baptiste Tavernier, after whom it was called the Tavernier Blue. Its last owner was famed jeweler Harry Winston before he donated it to the Smithsonian National Museum of Natural History in Washington, D.C. Colorless (“White”) diamonds have remained the most popular type of diamond through the millennia, but the existence of this blue diamond so long ago affirms the reality of the demand for fancy color diamonds over the years.

Color
In gemology, color is divided into three components: hue, saturation and tone. Blue diamonds occur in hues ranging from green-blue to gray-blue, with the primary hue necessarily being blue. Green and gray are the normal secondary hues that can be found in blue diamonds. Blue diamonds are considered most beautiful and valuable when there is no secondary color present but rather are a pure blue color. However, a pure blue diamond of light color may be considered less valuable than a green-blue or gray-blue diamond whose color is more vivid. The characteristic of color is very complex in blue diamonds for this reason. Most pure blue diamonds are Type IIb, meaning they contain either very few or a complete lack of nitrogen impurities. Type Ia blue stones contain a secondary hue and get their color from the presence of hydrogen.

Clarity
As with all diamonds, the loupe standard is used to grade clarity. This means that the inclusions are judged based on the appearance of the diamond under 10x magnification, and not how it would appear to the naked eye. Unlike in colorless diamonds, the clarity in blue diamonds has little effect on the diamond’s value. The exception is when there is an especially high clarity on a very vividly colored diamond. In this case, the clarity can add tremendous value.

Treatments
Blue diamonds are only considered rare and valuable if they are natural. The definition of a natural blue diamond is a blue diamond that was mined with its blue color already present. Since the 1950s, many methods have been developed to change a diamond’s appearance, including adding color to a colorless stone. These are considered enhanced diamonds and do not have the value or resale value of a natural blue diamond. Enhanced blue diamonds are not bought with the intention of investment or eventual resale. Synthetic blue diamonds have also been made, using the HPHT method.

Blue diamond mines
The earliest recorded blue diamond, the Hope Diamond, was discovered in India, in the Kollur mine in the Guntur district of Andhra Pradesh (which at the time was part of the Golconda kingdom), in the seventeenth century. However, blue diamonds have also been discovered in the Cullinan Mine in South Africa and the Golconda region. A few blue diamonds have been discovered in the Argyle Mine in Western Australia as well, and are offered at their annual Argyle Tender when they are found. It is thought that blue diamonds, unlike most other diamonds, are formed in the lower part of Earth’s mantle, and that the boron creating their blue color originates from serpentinite carried down to the mantle by subducting ocean tectonic plates.

Blue diamonds in popular culture
Aside from the fabled curse of the Hope Diamond, blue diamonds do not yet represent a large part of world culture. However, as of 2015, blue diamonds have become the most sought-after gems at auction. This was instigated by the sale of the 9.75-carat fancy vivid blue "Zoe" diamond to Hong Kong billionaire Joseph Lau, who bought it for, and named it after, his young daughter, Zoe.

An anthropomorphic character known as Blue Diamond is a member of the Great Diamond Authority in the TV show Steven Universe.

Notable blue diamonds

Gallery

See also

Red diamond
Pink diamond
List of minerals
List of diamonds

References

Further reading
 Cooper, J. C. (ed.) (1992). Brewer's Myth and Legend. New York: Cassell Publishers Ltd. .
 Hurlbut, Cornelius S.; Klein, Cornelis (1985). Manual of Mineralogy (20th ed.). New York: John Wiley and Sons. .
 Rachminov, Eden (2009). “The Fancy Color Diamond Book: Facts and Secrets of Trading in Rarities” New York: Diamond Odyssey. 
 Tavernier, Jean-Baptiste (1925 [1676]). Travels in India  (second edition), Volume II. Edited by William Crooke and translated by V. Ball. London: Oxford University Press.
 Weinstein, Michael (1958). The World of Jewel Stones. New York: Sheriden House. .
 Wise, Richard W. (2003). Secrets of the Gem Trade: The Connoisseur's Guide to Precious Gemstones. Lenox, Mass.: Brunswick House Press. . . Online Emerald chapters.

External links

Diamond colors
Blue diamonds